The Mynydd Pencarreg transmitting station is a broadcasting and telecommunications facility located on high ground about   south of Lampeter, in Ceredigion, Wales. Despite this, Mynydd Pencarreg was never a 405-line TV broadcast site.

Broadcast UHF television was added to the site in early 1981, launching with just the three programme services that were active at the time. S4C was added in 1982 when it launched.

Currently, the transmitter provides DVB-T digital television to the Lampeter area, along with FM radio.

Services listed by frequency

Analogue television

February 1981 - 1 November 1982

1 November 1982 - 19 August 2009
Channel 4 was added to the set transmitted from the site when it launched in November 1982. Being in Wales, Mynydd Pencarreg radiated the S4C variant.

Analogue and digital television

19 August 2009 - 16 September 2009
The UK's digital switchover commenced, mirroring the changes taking place at the parent transmitter at Preseli. Analogue BBC Two Wales closed on channel 64 and ITV1 Wales took over on that frequency for what would be its final 3 weeks of service, vacating channel 61 as it did so. The new digital BBC A multiplex started up at full power in 64-QAM mode on channel 61.

Digital television

16 September 2009 - 31 October 2012
All the analogue television services closed and the new digital multiplexes took over their frequencies.

31 October 2012 - present
OFCOM have announced that channel 61 is also to be cleared so as to make space for future 4G mobile phone services. At Mynydd Pencarreg, BBC A was moved from channel 61 to channel 49.

Analogue radio (FM VHF)

August 1981 - Late 1980s
FM radio from Mynydd Pencarreg launched in 1981, initially with just the three services that were typical of the time. For radio, the site was an off-air relay of Blaenplwyf.

Present

See also
List of masts
List of radio stations in the United Kingdom
List of tallest buildings and structures in Great Britain

References

External links
 The Transmission Gallery: Photographs and Information
 The 'ukfree' listing for Mynydd Pencarreg

Buildings and structures in Carmarthenshire
Transmitter sites in Wales